The third season of the American television musical drama series Nashville, created by Callie Khouri, began on September 24, 2014, on ABC. The show features an ensemble cast with Connie Britton and Hayden Panettiere in the leading roles as two country music superstars, Rayna Jaymes and Juliette Barnes.

The episodes are named after country songs from a variety of artists, like Webb Pierce ("That's Me Without You"), Willie Nelson (a number of songs, like "The Storm Has Just Begun") and Loretta Lynn ("You're Lookin' at Country").

Production
On  May 9, 2014, Nashville was renewed for a third season by ABC. The series was renewed after prolonged negotiations for a full 22-episode season. This season will receive a combined $8 million incentive package from the state of Tennessee, Metro Nashville and other local groups, lower than the Season 2 incentives — which totaled $13.25 million. On March 11, 2014, before the show was renewed, it was announced that Oliver Hudson and Will Chase are being promoted to regulars for season three, contingent on the ABC series getting a renewal. The series creator and executive producer later said that "a lot of our characters may not be in every episode this year".

On July 30, 2014, it was announced that Tony Award winner Laura Benanti was cast in the recurring role of country star Sadie Stone who is Rayna's friend. On August 1, 2014, it was announced that the first episode of the season will be aired live, and will consist of musical performances broadcast directly from the Bluebird Café. This will be the first time in TV history that a scripted drama has attempted this musical feat. On August 11, 2014, it was announced that actress-singer Brette Taylor joined the cast in a major recurring role as Pam, Luke’s sultry, extroverted new backup singer, and Alexa PenaVega also was cast for a multi-episode arc as Kiley, Gunnar’s first love and who is now a single mother. On August 14, 2014, it was announced that the Emmy Award Winning dancer Derek Hough, would also join the cast for a multi-episode arc as Noah West. On the same day, it was announced that Judith Hoag (Tandy Hampton) will be leaving the show after the second episode, but may return later. (She makes a guest appearance in "First To Have A Second Chance.") On September 12, 2014, it was announced that Mykelti Williamson was cast in a four-episode arc as musician who, after personal tragedy, lives as a nomad on the streets of Nashville. On October 27, 2014, it was announced that Moniqua Plante also was cast for a multiple-episode arc as Natasha, a woman, who "expected to provide some jaw-dropping twists for Teddy". Country singer Sara Evans joined the cast as a fictionalized version of herself. She had guest starring role in the episode dated October 29, 2014 and set to possible recurring return later with major story arc. On January 23, 2015, it was announced that Kyle Dean Massey joined the cast in a recurring role as openly gay country music singer-songwriter Kevin Bicks. Christina Aguilera later was cast as a pop superstar Jade St. John for a multi-episode arc.

Filming for season three ended on April 17, 2015.

Cast

Regular
 Connie Britton as Rayna Jaymes
 Hayden Panettiere as Juliette Barnes
 Clare Bowen as Scarlett O'Connor
 Chris Carmack as Will Lexington
 Will Chase as Luke Wheeler
 Eric Close as Teddy Conrad
 Charles Esten as Deacon Clayborne
 Oliver Hudson as Jeff Fordham
 Jonathan Jackson as Avery Barkley
 Sam Palladio as Gunnar Scott
 Lennon Stella as Maddie Conrad
 Maisy Stella as Daphne Conrad

Recurring
 Aubrey Peeples as Layla Grant
 David Alford as Bucky Dawes
 Laura Benanti as Sadie Stone
 Kourtney Hansen as Emily
 Ed Amatrudo as Glenn Goodman
 Andi Rayne and Nora Gill as Cadence Barkley
 Nick Jandl as Dr. Caleb Rand
 Moniqua Plante as Natasha
 Chaley Rose as Zoey Dalton
 Gunnar Sizemore as Micah Brenner
 Keean Johnson as Colt Wheeler
 Alexa PenaVega as Kiley Brenner
 Brette Taylor as Pam York
 Kyle Dean Massey as Kevin Bicks
 Judith Hoag as Tandy Hampton
 Mykelti Williamson as Terry George
 Derek Hough as Noah West
 Christina Aguilera as Jade St. John
 Scott Reeves as Noel Laughlin
 Rex Linn as Bill Lexington

Guest
 Dana Wheeler-Nicholson as Beverly O'Connor 
 Sylvia Jefferies as Jolene Barnes
 The Band Perry
 Luke Bryan as himself
 Sara Evans as a fictionalized version of herself
 Florida Georgia Line
 Joe Nichols as himself
 Brad Paisley as himself
 Amy Robach as herself
 Anthony Ruivivar as Rolling Stone reporter 
 Carrie Underwood as herself
 Trisha Yearwood as herself
 Pam Tillis as herself
 Mario Lopez as himself
 Tracey Edmonds as herself
 Charissa Thompson as herself
 Terri Clark as herself
 Chuck Wicks as himself
 Blair Garner as himself
 Bobby Bones as himself
 Lorrie Morgan as herself

Episodes

U.S. ratings

References

External links

Season 3
2014 American television seasons
2015 American television seasons